The 2017 Indy Eleven season was the club's fourth season of existence. The club played in North American Soccer League, which was the second tier of the American soccer pyramid.

Roster

Staff
  Tim Hankinson – Head Coach
  Tim Regan – Assistant Coach

Transfers

Winter
Note: Flags indicate national team as has been defined under FIFA eligibility rules. Players may hold more than one non-FIFA nationality.

In:

Out:

Summer

In:

Out:

Friendlies

Competitions

NASL Spring season

Standings

Results summary

Results by round

Matches

NASL Fall season

Standings

Results summary

Results by round

Matches

U.S. Open Cup

Squad statistics

Appearances and goals

|-
|colspan="14"|Players away on loan:
|-
|colspan="14"|Players who left Indy Eleven during the season:

|-
|}

Goal scorers

Disciplinary record

References

External links
 

Indy Eleven seasons
American soccer clubs 2017 season
2017 in sports in Indiana
2017 North American Soccer League season